Simorgh (Phoenix), also called Safir-2, is an Iranian expendable launch vehicle under development. It is the successor of the Safir, Iran's first space launch vehicle. Its mission is to carry heavier satellites into higher orbit than Safir.

The project was unveiled by Iranian President Mahmoud Ahmadinejad on 3 February 2010, as part of celebrations of the first anniversary of the launch of Omid, the first indigenously launched Iranian satellite, and was launched for the first time on 19 April 2016.

Design 
Simorgh is a two-stage liquid-fueled rocket developed from the Safir rocket. It is be able to place a  payload into a circular  low Earth orbit (LEO). It is also the first Iranian rocket that can place multiple payloads into orbit (e.g., one main payload and several secondary cubesats). In comparison, the Safir was only able to place a 50 kg payload into a 250x375 km elliptic orbit.

The first stage also utilize a set of four vernier engines sharing a single turbopump used for attitude control and providing an additional . At liftoff, these engines generate a total  of thrust. The second stage with a diameter of 1.5 meters utilizes a set of four smaller engines similar to the two engines of Safir's second stage. These produce a total  of thrust. 

The Simorgh's total flight time to a 500-530km orbit is between 480 and 495 seconds. The first stage burns for about 102 seconds. Stages separation takes place at an altitude of 90 km and a velocity of 2300 m/s. The fairing shroud is ejected simultaneously to the second stage engines ignition. The satellite is then accelerated to 7400 m/s and injected into its designated orbit.

In contrast to its predecessor Safir, the Simorgh is integrated and assembled vertically on a launch pad located at the Imam Khomeini Space Center. Each stage goes through manufacturing horizontally and is subsequently brought to the launch pad, where final assembly of the stages are completed with the aid of a custom designed service tower.  
 

Saman-1 is a solid-fueled orbital transfer system under development that produces  of thrust and will be used as an additional upper stage in future.

Reliability 
The development of the Simorgh has been marked with difficulties and unreliability of certain sub-systems due to the overcomplexity of its engines and turbopumps. Out of the system's first four launches (two orbital and two sub-orbital launches) there have been three failures, giving the rocket a reliability rating of twenty five percent. There were however, indications of progressive improvements to the design and reliability of the system with each successive launch; with the 2017 launch operating for 120 seconds before failure, the 2019 launch operating 450 seconds before failure, and the 2020 launch operating correctly for 475 seconds out of the 490 seconds of operation required for a successful mission, giving the missions a 25, 92, and 97 percent success rate respectively, indicating a trend of increasing reliability in the design.

Launch history

Development phase (2016-present)

Gallery

See also 
 Comparison of orbital launchers families
 Comparison of orbital launch systems
 Iranian Space Agency
Saman-1 (rocket stage)
Other Iranian satellite launch vehicles
 Safir (rocket)
 Qased (rocket)
 Qaem-100 (rocket)
Zuljanah (rocket)

References

External links 

Space launch vehicles of Iran
Microsatellite launch vehicles